Mangosuthu Buthelezi (born 1928) is former prime minister of Zululand, and South African politician who founded the Inkatha Freedom Party (IFP).

Buthelezi or Butelezi may also refer to:

Tribe
 Buthelezi (tribe), a Zulu-speaking tribe in South Africa, assimilated under Shaka during the Mfecane, the name survives as a surname

People 
 Sbuyiselwe Angela Buthelezi (born 1969), South African politician
 Gideon Buthelezi (born 1986), South African light flyweight boxer
 Linda Buthelezi (born 1969), South African footballer who played as a midfielder
 Mbongeni Buthelezi (born 1956), South African artist who "painted" in plastic
 Peter Fanyana John Butelezi, South African archbishop, Roman Catholic Archdiocese of Bloemfontein

Zulu-language surnames